2,3,4-Trimethylpentane is a branched alkane.  It is one of the isomers of octane.

References

External links
2,3,4-Trimethylpentane at environmentalchemistry.com

Alkanes